Baligród  (Balyhorod) is a village in Lesko County, in the Subcarpathian Voivodeship (province) of south-eastern Poland. It is also the seat of the municipality (gmina) called Gmina Baligród. Location: 49°21' N  22°17' E. From 1 January 1999 until 1 January 2002 it was located in Bieszczady County.

History

Formation 
Baligród, previously called Balówgród is a village situated in the valley of the Hoczewka river near the Bieszczady mountains. The settlement of Baligród occurred during the early parts of the 17th century by Sanocki Podkomorzy Piotr II Bal (Peter). A castle was built between 1600 and 1615 in this location with defense surrounding the castle. This defense included the Hoczewka and Stężnicki streams on three sides of the castle. The existence of the town is shown through a document that was issued by King Wladyslaw IV and was given to Peter's son Adam in 1634.

As the town began to grow, public buildings began to be created. In 1808, the community of Baligród got its own bathhouse and hospital (house for the poor). In 1855 the first post office of Baligród was built, and in the same year the Baligród court district was created. During 1862 a public school was established. In 1876, Baligród had gotten its own medical doctor in the Second Polish Republic. And in 1879, the first town church was formed.

Family Relationship 
The town stayed within the Bal family name until the end of the 18th century. The town was inherited by Peter's son, Stephen Bal. After Stephen, Baligród was passed down to his son Jon (John). John Bal was a huge contributor to the economic boom that Baligród had at the time. With his help, the town became a hugely famous wine market and a popular place of country gentleman's meetings. Salomea Bal Karsziniki, John Bal's daughter, was the last of the Bal family line to own the town as her son Andrew Karsznicki inherited the town after her. By the 19th century, Baligród's land was owned by many different people. In 1879, a Jewish settler by the name of Hersch Grossinger bought Baligród for 50,000 zlotys.

Economics 
Baligród was mainly composed of farmers and cattle breeders causing the main occupation to be breeding and cultivation. The town's farm listing in 1870 included 50 horses, 166 oxen, 117 cows, 63 sheep, and 63 pigs. In 1634 the town received Magdeburg rights and privileges allowing the townspeople to host markets, fairs, and wine storage. Due to Baligród being situated on the travel trade route to Hungary, opportunities for greater economic development grew. Markets were becoming more popular. A regular market was held in the town on Mondays where Hungarian wine, wax, honey, leather, wool, and linen was sold.  However, when the town began to decline in 1915,  Baligród lost its municipal rights. Other industries in Baligród included town sawmills, a mill, smithy, bakery, craftsmen, tailors, and shoemakers.

Jewish Community 
Jews living in Baligród date back to near the town's emergence. A Jewish man under the name Zelman lived in the area of Woronikowka  dating back to 1605 in historical records. Up until the end of the 18th century, the Jewish population of Baligród most likely worked with the Jewish Cooperative of Lesko, a Jewish Community in a larger town near Baligród. The Jews of Baligród were an average shtetl (Jewish village) that was composed of different shuls. Overall within the community, there were many young and sophisticated people. Hasidism dominated in the shtetl, but there were other beliefs including Prominent Judaism, Talmidei Chachamim, and Pious Judaism.

The first synagogue in Baligród was built near the beginning of the 18th century, even though the first records of the Jewish Community existing were not written until 1870.  A second synagogue was built around the 19th century which was located in the northwest corner of the main square that had led to the cemetery. The Jewish Community of Baligród had its own cemetery and religious school, with approximately 40 students enrolled.

Most Jewish families made a living off of trade and craft, especially in the market days. They owned 52 stores, taverns, and inns throughout Baligród.

Era of World Wars 
From January to March 1915, Baligród was in the middle of a World War I warzone between the Russian and Austro-Hungarian armies. The fighting was extremely dangerous and treacherous. Because of this, there was mass emigration during and after World War I. Around this time, some Zionism began to spread throughout Baligród. Just before the start of World War II on September 10, 1939, Slovakian and German troops occupied Baligród. Germany eventually opened a station for the Gestapo and an Arbeisamt (administration) in the area. The Ukrainians took over the Jewish school building and opened their own school forcing the Polish school to go into the poorest area of the town.

During this time when Germany occupied Poland, Baligród became a gathering area for some surrounding villages near the Bieszczady Mountains. These small villages included Solina, Wołkowyja, and Zawóz. It was also the place of the Baligród massacre, during which soldiers of the Ukrainian Insurgent Army targeted and murdered Polish civilians.

In the summer of 1942, 1200 local Jews were sent to the Zasław concentration camp and later sent to the Belzec extermination camp. The Jewish cemetery became an execution place of the Jews and Poles. The main synagogue was burned down by the Germans and its ruins dismantled after the war. The Jewish Cemetery was also destroyed and roads were paved with tombstones. In the autumn of 1942, Germans had taken 880 Jews to Załawie and killed them.

Between 1944 and 1946, members of the Ukrainian minority in Poland were forcibly repatriated from Poland to the Soviet Union. On March 28, 1947, Polish General Karol Swierczewski was killed nearby on a road to Cisna, close to Jablonki, by members of the Ukrainian Insurgent Army. In 1947, the People's Republic of Poland conducted Operation Vistula in an effort to eliminate the Ukranina Ingugency's support base in Baligród. The Remnants of the region's Ukrainian population were relocated to the Recovered Territories.

Emigration and Decline 
The first major decrease in the population of Baligród occurred in the 1720s after The Great Northern War had caused large amounts of damage throughout the town. The next large decrease in population had occurred during and after World War I as they were caught in the middle of a war zone  between two opposing armies, a situation that caused great destruction and instilled fear into the people of Baligród. During World War II, mass deportations of the Jews and mass killings likewise greatly decreased the town's population.

Baligród Today 
Baligród still remains as a village in Poland. After World War II, the Jewish community and Ukrainians never returned to Baligród and to this day there are very few, if any, Jews living in the town. It continues to be an area with small family farms. As most of the area of Baligród Commune is covered by forests and forest land, local activity is being focused on the wood industry. Today, Baligród is a tourist place due to its location near the Bieszczady Mountains and the significant historical sites of the area.

The family of the current Chief Rabbi of Poland, Michael Schudrich has roots in Baligród. The rabbi's mother's parents used to live there under the family name of Roth.

Notable sites 

 Catholic church (built in 1877–1879)
 Greek-Catholic church (from 1829)
 Military cemetery (est. 1946–1947, redesigned 1984)
 Bal's castle (remains of its foundations)
 Ruins of Jewish cemetery

References

External links
Baligród at Shtetlinks
History of Baligród 
My Shtetl Baligród
The Town of Baligród- Its History

Villages in Lesko County
Ruthenian Voivodeship
Populated places in the Kingdom of Galicia and Lodomeria
Lwów Voivodeship
Ukrainian Insurgent Army